Pouteria semecarpifolia is a species of plant in the family Sapotaceae. It is found in Dominica, Guadeloupe, Martinique, Saint Lucia, and Saint Vincent and the Grenadines.

References

semecarpifolia
Vulnerable plants
Taxonomy articles created by Polbot